Canton of Pont-de-l'Arche is a canton of the Arrondissement of Les Andelys in the Eure department of France.

Communes
At the French canton reorganisation which came into effect in March 2015, the canton was expanded from 10 to 21 communes (2 of which merged into the new commune Terres de Bord):

Acquigny
Alizay 
Amfreville-sur-Iton
Crasville
Criquebeuf-sur-Seine
Les Damps
La Haye-le-Comte
La Haye-Malherbe
Igoville
Le Manoir
Martot
Le Mesnil-Jourdain
Pinterville
Pîtres
Pont-de-l'Arche
Quatremare
Surtauville
Surville
Terres de Bord  
La Vacherie

References

Cantons of Eure